Events from the year 1529 in Ireland.

Incumbent
Lord: Henry VIII

Events
 September – Richard Gare Lynch becomes Mayor of Galway.
 Thomas Fitzgerald (1454–1534), becomes Earl succeeding his uncle James FitzGerald, 10th Earl of Desmond.
 William Skeffington was appointed  Lord Deputy of Ireland to Henry's son, the duke of Richmond, the nominal Lord Lieutenant of Ireland

Births

Deaths
 June 18 – James FitzGerald, 10th Earl of Desmond died in Dingle.

References